Gerena is a municipality in the Province of Seville, Spain. It is 25 km northwest of the provincial capital, Seville, and 10 km north of Olivares.

References

Municipalities of the Province of Seville